Jorge Murillo (born 15 November 1939) is a Costa Rican archer. He competed in the men's individual event at the 1980 Summer Olympics.

References

External links
 

1939 births
Living people
Costa Rican male archers
Olympic archers of Costa Rica
Archers at the 1980 Summer Olympics
Sportspeople from San José, Costa Rica
20th-century Costa Rican people
21st-century Costa Rican people